Alexandria is the ninth-largest city in the state of Louisiana and is the parish seat of Rapides Parish, Louisiana, United States. It lies on the south bank of the Red River in almost the exact geographic center of the state. It is the principal city of the Alexandria metropolitan area (population 153,922) which encompasses all of Rapides and Grant parishes. Its neighboring city is Pineville. In 2010, the population was 47,723, an increase of 3 percent from the 2000 census.

History 
Located along the Red River, the city of Alexandria was originally home to a community which supported activities of the adjacent French trader outpost of Post du Rapides. The area developed as an assemblage of traders, Caddo people, and merchants in the agricultural lands bordering the mostly unsettled areas to the north and providing a link from the south to the El Camino Real and then larger settlement of Natchitoches, the oldest permanent settlement in the Louisiana Purchase.

Alexander Fulton, a businessman from Washington County, near Pittsburgh, Pennsylvania, received a land grant from Spain in 1762, and the first organized settlement was made at some point in the 1780s. In 1805, Fulton and business partner Thomas Harris Maddox laid out the town plan and named the town in Fulton's honor. The earliest deed that survives for an Alexandria resident is from June 24, 1801, when a William Cochren, who identifies himself as "Slave master of the Southern Americas", sold a tract of land across the Red River to a William Murrey.

That same year, Fulton was appointed coroner in Rapides Parish by territorial Governor William C.C. Claiborne. Alexandria was incorporated as a town in 1818 and received a city charter in 1832.

In 1942, Alexandria was the site of the Lee Street Riot, an incident of racial violence occurred between mostly unarmed African Americans and armed military police. Witnesses state that as many as 20 people may have been killed, however the official report indicates that 3 African American soldiers were critically injured, and does not mention any deaths.

Geography and climate 

Alexandria is on a level plain in the center of the Louisiana Longleaf Pine forests, in which pine is interspersed with various hardwoods. A number of small bayous, such as Bayou Rapides, Bayou Robert, and Hynson Bayou, meander throughout the city. In the immediate vicinity of the city, cotton, sugar, alfalfa, and garden vegetables are cultivated.

The climate is humid subtropical with some continental influence in the winter. Summers are consistently hot and humid, whereas winters are mild, with occasional cold snaps. On average, the first freeze occurs in early to mid November and the last freeze occurs in early to mid March. The area receives plentiful rainfall year-round, with thunderstorms possible throughout the year. Some storms can be severe, especially during the spring months. According to 'Cities Ranked and Rated' (Bert Sperling and Peter Sander), Alexandria reports an average of 69 days per year with thunder reported, which is nearly double the national average. Snowfall is rare, with measurable snow having occurred 27 times since 1895. The heaviest snowfall event took place February 12–13, 1960, when 9.1" of snow fell.

Tropical storms and hurricanes affect Alexandria from time to time, but rarely cause severe damage, unlike areas closer to the coast. In September 2005, Hurricane Rita moved inland and affected Alexandria and surrounding areas, causing widespread power outages and damaging the roofs of some structures. The most recent hurricane, Gustav in 2008, caused widespread flooding, knocked over trees and power lines leading to power outages, and damaged structures. Some low-lying Alexandria neighborhoods had substantial flooding from Gustav, leaving several feet of water in houses.

Demographics

2020 census

As of the 2020 United States census, there were 45,275 people, 17,920 households, and 10,933 families residing in the city.

2010 census
As of the census of 2010, there were 47,723 people, 17,816 households, and 11,722 families residing in the city. The population density was 1,754.6/sq mi (677.5/km2). The racial makeup of the city was 38.32% White, 57.25% Black, 1.25% Native American, 1.85% Asian, 0.14% Pacific Islander, 1.03% from other races, and 1.09% from two or more races.  6.98% of the population were Hispanic or Latino of any race.

There were 17,816 households, out of which 31.9% had children under the age of 18 living with them, 38.5% were married couples living together, 23.2% had a female householder with no husband present, and 34.2% were non-families. 30.4% of all households were made up of individuals, and 12.1% had someone living alone who was 65 years of age or older.  The average household size was 2.50 and the average family size was 3.13.

In the city, the population was spread out, with 28.1% under the age of 18, 9.2% from 18 to 24, 26.2% from 25 to 44, 21.4% from 45 to 64, and 15.1% who were 65 years of age or older.  The median age was 36 years. For every 100 females, there were 83.5 males.  For every 100 females age 18 and over, there were 77.7 males.

The median income for a household in the city was $26,097, and the median income for a family was $31,978. Males had a median income of $29,456 versus $20,154 for females. The per capita income for the city was $16,242.  About 23.2% of families and 27.4% of the population were below the poverty line, including 37.7% of those under age 18 and 18.5% of those age 65 or over.

Religion

Like many other southern cities, the largest single church denomination in the Alexandria area is Southern Baptist. Large congregations include the Emmanuel Baptist Church and Calvary Baptist Church. Alexandria is the headquarters of the Louisiana Baptist Convention. Alexandria also has a significant number of Methodists, Presbyterians, Episcopalians, and Pentecostals.

A significant Catholic population is also present, a result of the large Catholic Acadian French population which resides in and around Alexandria, many from neighboring Avoyelles Parish. Alexandria is the headquarters for the Diocese of Alexandria.

Alexandria has a small, though active Jewish community which dates back to the mid-19th century. Jews have held positions in local government, civic organizations, education, and medicine. At one time, many large businesses in the downtown were Jewish-owned.  The Jewish community in Alexandria maintains two synagogues, which are approximately two blocks apart: Congregation Gemiluth Chassodim (Reform) and B'nai Israel Traditional Synagogue (Conservative).

Annual cultural events and festivals

Mardi Gras

Though Alexandria is north of the Cajun cultural area, the city recognizes Mardi Gras as an official holiday. The annual Mardi Gras Krewes Parade – occurring on the Sunday before Mardi Gras – on Texas Avenue is a major cultural festivity in the area. It is featured as a family-oriented event, and parade goers can enjoy over 20 New Orleans style floats, high school and college marching bands, as well as appearances by local celebrities. In addition to the main Sunday parade, the College Cheerleaders & Classic Cars Parade, which was established in 2008, takes place downtown on the Friday before Mardi Gras, the Children's Parade takes place downtown on the Saturday before Mardi Gras, and the Krewe of Provine Parade is held on Fat Tuesday, processing along Coliseum Boulevard. All the events are organized by the Alexandria Mardi Gras Association (AMGA). The Krewe Parade can attract from 120,000 to 150,000; the Children's parade, up to 40,000 to 50,000, and the College Cheerleaders & Classic Cars, about 5,000 to 15,000 people.

Alex River Fête

An annual three-day festival is held in downtown Alexandria around late April and early May. The festival, established in 2013, was created around a former successful stand-alone event, the Louisiana Dragon Boat Races. It features the race and other former stand-alone events such as Dinner on the Bricks and the ArtWalk (now Art Fête) along with various booth venues, food, and live music, as well as the Kids Fête and Classic Car Fête.

Alex Winter Fête

An annual three day festival held in downtown Alexandria around early December. Launched in 2015, the festival first year drew about double the anticipated crowd of 15,000. The festival, like the Alex River Fête, feature booth venues, food, and live music but also features an ice rink. In January 2017, the Alex Winter Fête was voted Festival of the Year by the Louisiana Travel Promotion Association.

Former events

Cenlabration

Begun in the late 1980s, Cenlabration
was one of the largest festivals in Central Louisiana (Cenla). The name comes from Central Louisiana ("LA") Celebration, and reflects local culture and heritage, as well as serving as a means of celebrating Labor Day as the end of summer.

As many as three stages support a particular type of music, including Cajun and zydeco, blues and jazz, and Country music.  In addition there are arts and crafts booths for local artists to sell their wares. In the Children's Village, children can participate in arts and crafts, listen to storytellers, play games with clowns, or watch a play.  The festival has plenty of carnival rides available as well. Cenlabration ends with a large fireworks display.

The festival ran for 20 years until cancellation due to finances. The city ended its annual support of $40,000 because of budget constraints.

RiverFest

In 2002, representatives of local government, businesses, organizations, and community formed the nonprofit organization River Cities Cultural Alliance, Inc. to promote tourism and the arts through a celebration of Central Louisiana's diverse cultural heritage. The nonprofit served to organize and put on RiverFest: Heritage and Arts on the Red. More than ten thousand festival-goers attending the event.

RiverFest was held in downtown Alexandria and on the Alexandria and Pineville levees. The festival features the work of visual artists from across the South, food booths exemplifying southern cuisine, a variety of children's activities, three outdoor stages with a wide range of music, dance, and theatrical performances, and a literary component with readings and panel discussions by Louisiana authors and scholars.

RiverFest was canceled in 2007.

Que'in on the Red

An annual barbecue festival launched in 2006, the festival was held on the levee near downtown Alexandria and was well known for its big-name entertainment. The event was cancelled in 2012 due to its high cost and the city deciding against continued support of $100,000 annually.

Museums

The Alexandria Museum of Art was founded in 1977 and occupies an historic Rapides Bank Building on the banks of the Red River. The building was built c. 1898 and is listed on the National Register of Historic Places. The museum opened to the public in March 1998. In 1998, the Alexandria Museum of Art expanded and constructed its grand foyer and offices as an annex to the Rapides Bank Building. In 1999, the Alexandria Museum of Art was honored as an Outstanding Arts Organization in the Louisiana Governor's Arts Awards. In 2007, the Alexandria Museum of Art entered into a collaborative endeavor agreement with Louisiana State University of Alexandria (LSUA). The Alexandria Museum of Art now also serves as a downtown campus for LSUA classes, and is host to multidisciplinary community events, including concerts and recitals, lectures, yoga classes, Second Saturday Markets, and Museum Afterhours.

The Louisiana History Museum is located downtown on the bottom floor of the former library. A small facility, it showcases the history of all Louisiana, with emphasis on the central portion of the state, Rapides Parish, and Alexandria. Major exhibit areas concern Native Americans, Louisiana geography, politics, health care, farming, and the impact of war.

The T.R.E.E. House Children's Museum and Arna Bontemps African American Museum are located within the Cultural Arts District.

The Kent Plantation House in Alexandria, completed by 1800, was located on a Spanish land grant. It is the oldest standing structure in Central Louisiana, one of only two buildings in the city to survive the burning of 1864 by Union troops fleeing after having been defeated at the Battle of Mansfield in DeSoto Parish. The house has been moved from its original location but is still located on part of the first land grant. It is open for tours daily except Sundays at 9, 10, and 11 a.m. and 1, 2, and 3 p.m. The tour is led by costumed docents and includes the house furnished in period pieces, some belonging to the original family, and all nine outbuildings, including an 1840-50s sugar mill, blacksmith shop, barn, two slave cabins, open-hearth kitchen, and milk house.

Performing arts

The performing arts are centered in the Alexandria Cultural Arts District in the downtown. Located within a few blocks of each other are three performance venues: Coughlin-Saunders Performing Arts Center, the Hearn Stage, and the Riverfront Amphitheater.

The Coughlin-Saunders Performing Arts Center is the home of the Rapides Symphony Orchestra, which has performed in Alexandria since 1968. The center hosts the Performing Arts Series of the Arts Council of Central Louisiana, the Red River Chorale (an auditioned community chorus), and presentations of numerous local theater groups. The land for the center was donated by The Alexandria Town Talk newspaper, owned by the Gannett Company of McLean, Virginia.

Businesswoman Jacqueline Seagall Caplan (1935–2016) was the president of the Arts Council of Central Louisiana and the chairman of the group's executive committee when the Coughlin-Saunders Performing Arts Center opened in 2004. She predicted that Coughlin-Saunders would in time "provide a place people can point to and say it's theirs. ... [Until now], we've never had a performing arts center where every type of performing art can come."

The Hearn Stage is a black box theater for smaller productions.  The Arts Council provides day-to-day management of both the Coughlin-Saunders Center and the Hearn Stage.

The Riverfront Amphitheater hosts each April a "Jazz on the River" music festival, sponsored by the Arna Bontemps African American Museum. The Rapides Symphony holds an annual fall Pops concert in the amphitheater. In recent years, the amphitheater has welcomed musical guests in conjunction with the springtime Dragonboat Races sponsored by the Alexandria Museum of Art.

The spring and fall seasons also feature Downtown Rocks, a free outdoor concert series in nearby Fulton Park.

Sports

Alexandria was home to the Alexandria Aces, a summer college league baseball team. The Aces were champions in various leagues in 1997, 1998, 2006, and 2007. They played their home games at Bringhurst Field. Unfortunately, due to lack of repairs on the stadium, combined with the aging of it caused interest in the team to unfortunately drop, with much of the wooden stands being barricaded. The remaining games of the 2013 season were canceled in mid-July because of low attendance, which averaged fewer than two hundred per game. The stadium's office and clubhouse were destroyed by a fire in 2014 and were subsequently torn down. In 2017, it was decided that the stadium would become a green space, open to the public and welcome news to those concerned about the building's future. The scoreboard and outfield walls have been removed, but most of the stadium is still intact. In 1974, a Little League team from Alexandria won the Louisiana state championship.

Alexandria had a minor league ice hockey team, the Alexandria Warthogs. They played their home games at the Rapides Parish Coliseum.

A professional indoor football team, the Louisiana Rangers, played their home games at the Rapides Parish Coliseum. They played in the Central District of the Southern American Football League, and the Southern Conference of the National Indoor Football League (NIFL). The team was owned by a Lafayette business group before moving in 2003 to Beaumont, Texas.

Alexandria is also home to the U-14 Crossroads Pride soccer team. They won the 2012 Louisiana Soccer Association State Cup. The Pool Boys FC soccer team, a member of the Gulf Coast Premier League, plays at Johnny Downs Sports Complex.

Nearby is Bringhurst Golf Course, popularly known as "the nation's oldest par-three course." A full-scale renovation was completed in mid-2010. In addition to Bringhurst, named for the late industrialist R.W. Bringhurst, Alexandria is home to four other golf courses: Oak Wing, The Links on the Bayou, at LSUA, and Alexandria Golf and Country Club.

Alexandria was also home to the Cenla Derby Dames, a roller derby team that operates under the Women's Flat Track Derby Association.  The Dames played their home games at the Rapides Parish Coliseum.

Notable people

 Anna Margaret – singer, actress
 Emmanuel Arceneaux – Canadian football player
 Jay Aldrich – Major League Baseball player
 John Ardoin – music critic for The Dallas Morning News
 Louis Berry – first African-American to practice law in Alexandria; civil rights advocate
 Chris Boniol - American football player
 Arna Bontemps – African American poet and member of Harlem Renaissance
 Thomas "Bud" Brady – state representative (1976-1988) from La Salle Parish; thereafter a real estate appraiser in Alexandria
 Bubby Brister – Quarterback Pittsburgh Steelers, Philadelphia Eagles, New York Jets, Denver Broncos, and Minnesota Vikings
 Markel Brown – guard in the Israeli Basketball Premier League
 Arthur H. Butler – Marine Corps Major General and Navy Cross recipient
 D. J. Chark - American football player
 Carl B. Close – state representative (1944-1947) and mayor of Alexandria (1947-1953)
 Luther F. Cole – associate justice of the Louisiana Supreme Court from 1986 to 1992, former state representative from East Baton Rouge Parish; born in Alexandria
 Clifford Ann Creed – golfer; winner of eleven LPGA Tour events
 William A. Culpepper – Judge for one term on the 9th Judicial District Court and twenty-two years on the Louisiana Court of Appeal for the Third Circuit, Alexandria native who spent later years in Little Rock, Arkansas 
 Israel "Bo" Curtis – African-American Democrat member of the Louisiana House of Representatives from District 26 from 1992 to 2008
 Cleveland Dear – U.S. representative from 1933 to 1937, district attorney, and state district court judge
 Herbert B. Dixon – member of the Louisiana House of Representatives from District 26 (2008-2014) and member of the Rapides Parish School Board from District D (1992-2008) 
 Demar Dotson - American football player 
 C. H. "Sammy" Downs – attorney and politician
 Mike Edmonson – superintendent of the Louisiana State Police since 2008
 James R. Eubank – Alexandria lawyer; member of the Louisiana House of Representatives for Rapides Parish in 1952; died in office at the age of thirty-seven
 Steve Gainer –  Cinematographer and Director
 H. N. Goff – state representative from Rapides Parish, 1952–1956; insurance agent in Alexandria
 Layon Gray – Playwright and director of the Off-Broadway hit play Black Angels Over Tuskegee. The story of the Tuskegee Airmen. 
 Lawrence Preston Joseph Graves – Roman Catholic bishop of Alexandria from 1973 to 1982
 Charles Pasquale Greco – Roman Catholic bishop of Alexandria from 1946 to 1973
 Jeff Hall – incoming first African-American mayor of Alexandria; state representative for District 26 in Rapides Parish, 2015-2018
 Lance Harris – District 25 state representative
 Eric Johanson – blues rock musician
 Josh Johnson – comedian.
 Gary Lee Jones – Rapides Parish school superintendent, 2003–2012;  member of the Louisiana Board of Elementary and Secondary Education since 2016; Alexandria resident
 Catherine D. Kimball –  former Chief Justice of the Louisiana Supreme Court
 Maxie Lambright – football coach for Louisiana Tech University, 1967–1978; coached at Bolton High School in Alexandria, 1955 to 1958
 D.L. Lang - Poet Laureate of Vallejo, California
 F.A. Little, Jr. – retired judge of the United States District Court for the Western District of Louisiana
 George S. Long – former U.S. representative
 Gillis William Long – former U.S. representative
 Jay Luneau – lawyer and state senator, effective January 2016 
 Gerald Archie Mangun –  late pastor of the Pentecostal Church, the largest congregation in Alexandria
 Rod Masterson – actor
 Terry Alan "Tet" Mathews – former Major League Pitcher, Born 1964 died 2012. Pitched for Texas Rangers, Florida Marlins, Baltimore Orioles, and Kansas City Royals
 Mildred Methvin – former United States magistrate judge of the Western District of Louisiana, based in Lafayette; native of Alexandria
 Warren Morris – Major League Baseball player
 Craig Nall – National Football League player
 J. Tinsley Oden – mathematician
 Jewel Prestage – first African-American woman to earn a Ph.D. in political science, former Dean of the School of Public Policy and Urban Affairs at Southern University.
 Juan Pierre – Major League Baseball player
 Ed Rand – state representative from 1960 to 1964
 Joe Ray – contemporary visual artist
 Joseph E. Ransdell – U.S. Senator from Louisiana, 1913-1931 
 Slater Rhea – Singer and TV personality on national TV in China.
 Sterling Ridge – Arizona legislator
 Alvin Benjamin Rubin – federal judge, 1966-1991
 Bill Schroll – National Football League player
 Gustav Anton von Seckendorff – author, actor and declaimer
 William Tecumseh Sherman –  first superintendent; Louisiana State Seminary of Learning & Military Academy (later to become LSU)
 Russ Springer  – Major League Baseball player for 18 years
 David Theophilus Stafford  – Rapides Parish sheriff from 1888 to 1904
 Grove Stafford, Sr. – Alexandria lawyer and state senator from 1940 to 1948
 Leroy Augustus Stafford – planter and Confederate brigadier general mortally wounded in the Battle of the Wilderness in 1864
 Lloyd George Teekell – state representative from 1953 to 1960 and 9th Judicial District Court judge from 1979 to 1990
 Jeff R. Thompson – former state representative for Bossier Parish; judge of the 26th Judicial District Court since 2015; born in Alexandria in 1965
 Cullen Washington Jr. – contemporary abstract painter.
 Muse Watson – actor
 James Madison Wells – 19th century governor of Louisiana
 Rebecca Wells – author, actor, and playwright, best known for Divine Secrets of the Ya-Ya Sisterhood
 Joanne Lyles White – humanitarian, philanthropist; founder and first president of the Louisiana Speech League
 J. Robert Wooley – Louisiana insurance commissioner from 2000 to 2006, was reared in Alexandria, where his father was a principal at the Louisiana Special Education Center there.

Media

Newspapers

Established March 17, 1883, The Alexandria Town Talk  is a daily newspaper for Alexandria-Pineville and the thirteen parishes which comprise central Louisiana. The newspaper was owned by the family of the late Jane Wilson Smith and Joe D. Smith, Jr., until March 1996, when it was sold to Central Newspapers. In August 2000, the Gannett Company acquired the Central Newspapers properties, including The Town Talk. The name of the paper on its inaugural issue was the Alexandria Daily Town Talk.  Although it has since been shorted to the current The Town Talk, it is still frequently referred to by long-time residents as the Daily Town Talk.

Television
Alexandria is served by local television stations KALB-TV (NBC / CBS), WNTZ (Fox), KLAX-TV (ABC), KLPA (PBS/LPB), and KBCA (The CW). KALB is the oldest television station in central Louisiana.

Alexandria is the location of the pawn shop in the show Cajun Pawn Stars on the History Channel.

Radio 

Local radio stations

AM broadcasting 
 KJMJ 580 – Religious
 KSYL 970 – News / Talk / Sports
 KDBS 1410 – ESPN Radio

FM broadcasting 
 KAYT 88.1 – Urban adult contemporary
 KLXA 89.9 – Christian contemporary / K-LOVE
 KLSA 90.7 – Public radio / Red River Radio
 KAPM 91.7 – American Family Radio
 KQID-FM 93.1 – Top 40/CHR
 KMXH 93.9 – Urban adult contemporary
 KZMZ 96.9 – Classic rock
 KKST 98.7 – Urban contemporary
 KRRV-FM 100.3 – Mainstream country
 KBCE 102.3 – Adult hits
 KLAA-FM 103.5 – Mainstream country
 KEZP 104.3 – Christian adult contemporary
 KBKK 105.5 – Classic country
 KEDG 106.9 – Adult contemporary

Translate broadcasting 

 K234CY 94.7 – Sports talk (translators to KDBS)
 K265FB 100.9 – Soft adult contemporary (translators to KQID-FM)
 K285HF 104.9 – News / Talk / Sports (translators to KSYL)

Low-power broadcasting 
 KZLC-LP 95.5 – Alternative Christian

Digital broadcasting 
 KLSA-HD1
 KLSA-HD2
 KLSA-HD3
 KQID-HD1
 KQID-HD2
 KQID-HD3
 KRRV-HD1
 KRRV-HD2
 KRRV-HD3

Parks and outdoor attractions

Alexandria Zoological Park

The Alexandria Zoological Park is a  zoo first opened to the public in 1926. Owned by the City of Alexandria and operated by the Division of Public Works, it is home to about 500 animals and includes an award-winning Louisiana Habitat exhibit. The zoo is accredited by the Association of Zoos and Aquariums (AZA) and takes part in about 20 Species Survival Plans (SSP) as part of its conservation efforts.

Cotile Lake Recreation Area 
The Louisiana Wild Life and Fisheries Commission stocked this impoundment with the proper species and number of game fish in 1965–66 shortly after its completion date. The recreational facilities include a large area cleared and zoned for swimming with complete bath house facilities nearby. There is a water skiing area that is cleared and snagged for safety of the skiers. The picnic and camping areas are modern and complete. There is also space available for campers.

Indian Creek Lake and Recreation Area 
Encompasses a  lake,  of developed recreation facilities and a  primitive camping area all within the Alexander State Forest. The lake, located in central Louisiana, was constructed as a joint venture of the Louisiana Forestry Commission, the Rapides Parish Police Jury, and the Lower West Red River Soil and Water Conservation District as a reservoir for agricultural irrigation in times of need and for recreation purposes.

The recreation area camping area contains 109 campsites with conventional full utility hookups, 3 beaches for swimming, bath houses, a boat launch, and 75 picnic sites. A covered pavilion within the developed area provides for groups up to 100 people. The recreation area is open year-round and operates on user fees.

Kisatchie National Forest 
Alexandria sits in the middle of the Kisatchie National Forest.  Ranger districts are north, northwest, west and southwest of the city. An abundance of large timberlands and forest nurseries, as well as lake and recreation areas, are within a short driving distance.

Other points of interest

Alexandria Memorial Gardens – large cemetery on U.S. Highway 165 south. Other cemeteries are also available in Pineville.
Alexandria Levee Park – a park located downtown, adjacent to the Red River, that serves as the grounds for some local festivals. It contains an amphitheatre that is used for concerts.
Alexandria Mall – the local shopping mall located on Masonic Drive, established 1973
Alexandria Riverfront Center – convention center located downtown
Bringhurst Field – home of the Alexandria Aces
Bringhurst Park – contains the Alexandria Zoo, Bringhurst Field, a playground, a golf course and tennis courts
Hotel Bentley – historic hotel built in 1908
Inglewood Plantation – plantation located south of Alexandria
Kent Plantation House – French colonial plantation house
Masonic Home – a now defunct orphanage in south Alexandria completed in 1924.
Rapides Parish Coliseum – a multi-purpose arena used for sporting events, conventions and other events

Military

Louisiana National Guard 
Alexandria is home to both Headquarters and Company B of the 199th Brigade Support Battalion (BSB). The 199th BSB is the logistical component of the 256th Infantry Brigade that served in Operation Iraqi Freedom from October 2004 until September 2005. The 199th BSB provides supply and transportation (Company A), medical (Company C) and maintenance (Company B) support and services that keep the 256th Brigade operational. The battalion also has units located in Jonesboro, Winnfield, Colfax, and St. Martinville, Louisiana.

England Air Force Base 
Alexandria served as the home of England Air Force Base from its origins as an emergency airstrip for Esler Regional Airport until its closure. England AFB was officially closed on December 15, 1992, pursuant to the Defense Base Closure and Realignment Act (Public Law 101–510) and recommendations of the Defense Secretary's Commission on Base Realignment and Closure. The base now serves as Alexandria International Airport (see below).

Economy

According to Census ACS 1-year survey for 2016, the per capita income of Alexandria was $23,962. This is $1,702 lower than the Louisiana average for per capita income in the same period. That figure is at $31,128 nationally. The Alexandria workforce consists of about 55,000 residents. Union Tank Car Company has recently located a plant northwest of Alexandria near the airport creating hundreds of jobs. Expansions at the Procter & Gamble plant and the construction of a PlastiPak plant in nearby Pineville have also created a number of new jobs for the area. Sundrop Fuels Inc., a Colorado-based biofuels start-up, plans to construct an over 1,200 acre plant just southwest of Alexandria in Rapides Station area. The facility will serve as the headquarters for the company because aside from the plant itself, Sundrop has also bought Cowboy Town, an abandon entertainment venue that sits inside the surrounding land that was purchased, to house their offices and their maintenance and fabrication operations.

In 2007, Inc. Magazine rated Alexandria as the 77th best place in which to conduct business out of the 393 U.S. cities ranked, a significant increase from its ranking as No. 276 in 2006. Among other Louisiana cities, Alexandria ranked second, following only Baton Rouge, which ranked 59th nationally.

Healthcare

Alexandria is home to two major hospitals: Rapides Regional Medical Center, a former Baptist hospital is located downtown. Christus St. Frances Cabrini Hospital was opened in 1950 and is located at the corner of Masonic Drive and Texas Avenue. Both hospitals have undergone expansion.

Additionally, located just across the Red River in Pineville, the Veteran's Affairs Medical Center at Alexandria serves central Louisiana and surrounding areas.

Meanwhile, in 2013, the state allocated $15 million to move the medical services long provided at no or minimal charge at the Huey P. Long Medical Center in Pineville to the former hospital at England Park at the site of the closed England Air Force Base.

Port of Alexandria
In the early 19th century, the Port of Alexandria brought goods to the area and shipped cotton and other local products to the rest of the country. A ferry connected the cities of Alexandria and Pineville until a bridge was built across the Red in 1900.

Today, Port facilities include: a 40-ton crane for off-loading, a  warehouse, 13,600-ton bulk fertilizer warehouse, a 3,400-ton bulk fertilizer dome structure and a 5,000-ton dome which was added in January 2005.

The petroleum off-loading facility includes two  tanks, one  tank capable of handling two barges and five truck off-loading simultaneously.  There is also a general cargo dock with access to rail and a hopper barge unloading dock with conveyor system.

Today's modern facilities and the Port's central location with its connection to the Mississippi River provide excellent opportunities for importers and exporters.

Alexandria International Airport

Alexandria International Airport (AEX) is a regional airport, providing flights to Atlanta, Dallas/Ft. Worth, and Houston. In 2006 a new-state-of-the-art passenger terminal was dedicated. Alexandria is served by American, United, and Delta.

Current military use
Formerly known as England AFB until 1992, Alexandria International Airport additionally has numerous international charter airlines using the airport in the transport of military personnel attached to the United States Army base at Fort Polk. A new military personnel terminal opened in 2007.

Government and politics

Local government

History 

Following the Civil War, all public records in Alexandria had been destroyed. On September 29, 1868, the city was granted a new charter with a government consisting of a Mayor, Treasurer, and Justice of the Peace. Nine aldermen represented the four wards of the city – two from each ward and one elected at-large.

In 1912, the Lawrason Act established Alexandria municipal government in a strong mayor format, where the mayor was also the Commissioner of Public Health and Safety (Police, Fire, Sanitation). There were separate Commissioners of Streets and Parks and Finance and Utilities, elected citywide. Those positions were discontinued in 1977.

Today 
Alexandria has a mayoral-council system of government.  The Mayor serves as the executive branch of the local government. The current Mayor - Jeff Hall (politician) - was elected in November 2018, succeeding long-time Mayor Jacques Roy, who had held the office since 2006.

The City Council serves as the legislative branch. The five districts of the city are represented on the council; in addition there are two council members elected to serve as at-large representatives of the city.

The Alexandria Court has a limited jurisdiction, consisting of the citizens of Wards 1, 2 and 8 in Rapides Parish. Within those boundaries the court has the power to hear and decide both criminal and civil cases, rule in civil cases and hand down judgment for punishment in criminal cases.

Area politics 

Overall, the people of the Alexandria area tend to be conservative. Even though the majority typically elects Republicans in national elections, they vote for Democrats in local elections, many of which are not contested by the GOP.

United States Congressional district 
From 1913 to 1993, Alexandria served as the seat of Louisiana's Eighth Congressional district.  A Democratic seat, it was held by the Long family for nearly half of its existence, from 1953 to 1987, broken only by the two terms of Harold B. McSween and three terms of Republican Clyde Holloway of Forest Hill. The seat was removed after the 1990 census indicated Louisiana no longer had the population to support it. The district was split among the Fourth, Fifth and Sixth Congressional districts. Alexandria is now in the Fifth district and was represented from 2003 to 2013 by Rodney Alexander, a Democrat-turned-Republican. From November 2013 to January 2015 the representative is Vance McAllister of Ouachita Parish. Since March 2021, the Fifth has been represented by Julia Letlow of Start in Richland Parish.

Education

Colleges and universities

Situated south of the city, Louisiana State University at Alexandria (or LSUA) is a regional campus of the state's flagship university system, Louisiana State University.  From its establishment in 1959, the campus offered only two-year degrees; students seeking baccalaureate degrees had to commute or move to the main campus in Baton Rouge in order to gain a four-year degree.  After 1976, students could either commute or telecommute in order to attend upper-level courses, including graduate classes.  In 2002, following approval by the Louisiana State University Board of Supervisors and the Louisiana Board of Regents the Louisiana Legislature passed legislation allowing LSUA to offer baccalaureate degrees.

A four-year degree is also attainable through Southern Baptist-affiliated Louisiana Christian University in Pineville, founded in 1906.

Alexandria also has one of the Region 6 Louisiana Technical College campuses.

Primary and secondary schools 

Rapides Parish School Board operates public schools.

Alexandria has three public high schools: Bolton High School, Alexandria Senior High School, and Peabody Magnet High School. In addition, there are two private high schools: the Roman Catholic Holy Savior Menard Central High School, and Grace Christian.

Transportation

Roads 
Alexandria serves as the crossroads of Louisiana. To reach either Shreveport or Monroe from the southern portion of the state, the easiest method of travel takes the driver through Alexandria.  Likewise, if a visitor is to head from the northern portion of the state to the Cajun portions of the state (Lake Charles and Lafayette), or the greater metropolitan areas of either Baton Rouge or New Orleans, the easiest method of travel involves driving down Interstate 49 through Alexandria.

In addition to I-49, travelers can follow Louisiana 1 up to Alexandria from Baton Rouge and points south.  Also, Highway 167 could be taken from Opelousas north to Ruston, crossing through Alexandria at one of the few bridges over the Red River in central Louisiana.  Highways 165 and 71 also link Alexandria and points south with the northern and southern portions of the state via the Curtis-Coleman bridge.

There are possible plans for a 50-mile, 4 lane beltway to encircle Alexandria and Pineville. As of now, it is only in the planning stages of development.

Bridges 
Three road bridges cross the Red River in the Alexandria area.  They are:
The Purple Heart Memorial Bridge. Part of the Alexandria-Pineville Expressway (also referred to as the Cottingham Expressway), it connects Interstate 49 to Highway 167 by crossing the Red River from downtown Alexandria to Pineville. It replaced the Fulton Street Bridge and has six lanes of traffic.  Designed by the Louisiana Department of Transportation and Development (LADOTD), the bridge cost $15.9 million in federal and state funds. The northbound portion was completed in 1995, the southbound in 1998.

The U.S. 165 Business Bridge (alternatively, the Gillis Long Bridge, the Red River Bridge or the Jackson Street Bridge) connecting downtown Pineville with the business district in Alexandria. It is a two-lane vertical-lift bridge with a sidewalk/bikepath on either side. The bridge is named after U.S. Representative Gillis Long, who represented Louisiana's Eighth Congressional District. It was built in 1985 to replace the Murray Street Bridge.
The Curtis-Coleman (Fort Buhlow) Bridge A new four-lane (two lanes in each direction) bridge was built beside the aging OK Allen Bridge and opened in May, 2016.  At that time US 165 will be completely four-laned for most of its traverse of Louisiana. It was demolished on September 26, 2015.

Former bridges include:
The Murray Street Bridge.  One of the first bridges in Alexandria.  A two-lane steel truss swing bridge, it decayed over time, finally being demolished in 1983.  The approach on the Alexandria side was turned into a river overlook as part of the Alexandria Levee Park.
The Fulton Street Bridge.  Named after Fulton Street which it connected with Highway 167. Technically part of the Alexandria-Pineville Expressway, it was a four-lane steel vertical-lift bridge.  It was demolished in 1994 to make way for the Purple Heart Memorial Bridge.
The Oscar K. Allen Bridge connected Highway 165/71 on both sides of the Red River. It was a two-lane K-truss type bridge, named after Governor Oscar K. Allen. It was built in 1936 to connect Alexandria to the (former) Fort Buhlow. It was replaced by the Curtis-Coleman (Fort Buhlow) Bridge next to it.

There are two railroad bridges over the Red River in Alexandria. One is located near the Buhlow area north of the OK Allen bridge. The other is south of the Purple Heart Memorial Bridge.

Mass transit 
Regional mass transit is handled by ATRANS (Alexandria Transportation Authority).

For those leaving or arriving at the city by bus, Greyhound Lines has a terminal downtown.

Airports 
Alexandria is served by the Alexandria International Airport and the Esler Regional Airport in Pineville.

Rail 
Alexandria does not have Amtrak service, nor a commuter rail system. The Kansas City Southern (Southern Belle) and the Missouri Pacific (since absorbed by Union Pacific) (Louisiana Eagle and Louisiana Daylight) operated train stations in the area in the early part of the 20th century but passenger services ended in the 1960s and the stations have closed.

Surrounding cities and towns 
Rapides Parish

Ball
Boyce
Cheneyville
Deville
Forest Hill
Lecompte
Pineville
Tioga
Woodworth

Grant Parish

Colfax
Creola
Dry Prong
Pollock
Prospect

Gallery

References

External links

 City of Alexandria : Government and community services.
 The Town Talk : Alexandria's Local Daily Newspaper.
 Visit Alexandria : Business Directory.

 
Cities in Louisiana
Cities in Rapides Parish, Louisiana
Parish seats in Louisiana
Populated places established in 1785
Cities in Alexandria metropolitan area, Louisiana
Cities in the Central Louisiana
1785 establishments in New Spain